Nienberge is a German community. It was independent until 1975 and has been part of Münster, North Rhine-Westphalia, since, located in the north-west of the town. It houses around 7,000 people. The independent community became part of Münster on 1 January 1975.

Sights 
 , Catholic parish church with late-Romanesque steeple (c. 1200) and late-Gothic nave (1499)
 , built by Johann Conrad Schlaun in Baroque style, later home of Annette von Droste-Hülshoff
 Orgelmuseum Fleiter

People from Nienberge 
 Annette von Droste-Hülshoff (1797–1848), poet and composer, her mother Therese, née von Haxthausen (1772–1853), her sister Jenny von Droste zu Hülshoff (1795–1859) and Jenny's nephews Moritz and Friedrich von Droste zu Hülshoff (1833–1905)
 Rolf Krumsiek (1934–2009), politician (SPD), Minister für Wissenschaft und Forschung and Justizminister of North Rhine-Westphalia 
 Harald Sievers (born 1975), politician (CDU), Landrat of Landkreis Ravensburg
 Christian Pander (born 1983), footballer

Literature 
 Karl Moritz (ed.): Chronik von Nienberge. Heimatverein Nienberge 1983.

External links 
 
 Nienberge
 Stadtbezirke und Stadtteile der Stadt Münster Münster
 Einwohnerzahlen der Stadtbezirke und Stadtteile der Stadt Münster Münster
 Nienberge LWL-Kulturatlas

Münster